The women's freestyle 67 kilograms is a competition featured at the 2011 World Wrestling Championships, and was held at the Sinan Erdem Dome in Istanbul, Turkey on 16 September 2011.

This freestyle wrestling competition consisted of a single-elimination tournament, with a repechage used to determine the winners of two bronze medals. The two finalists faced off for gold and silver medals. Each wrestler who lost to one of the two finalists moved into the repechage, culminating in a pair of bronze medal matches featuring the semifinal losers each facing the remaining repechage opponent from their half of the bracket.

Each bout consisted of up to three rounds, lasting two minutes apiece. The wrestler who scored more points in each round was the winner of that rounds; the bout finished when one wrestler had won two rounds (and thus the match).

Xiluo Zhuoma from China won the gold medal without losing a round in her four matches. she beat Banzragchiin Oyuunsüren of Mongolia 1–0 and 1–0 in the final. Yoshiko Inoue from Japan and the American Adeline Gray finished third and shared the bronze medal.

Results
Legend
F — Won by fall

Main bracket

Repechage

References
Results Book, Page 86

Women's freestyle 67 kg
World